Robert Edward Brooks (born 11 March 1966), better known by his ring name Robbie Brookside, is an English retired professional wrestler. He is currently signed to WWE, where he works as a trainer/producer for the NXT brand. He has toured all over the world during his career, wrestling in the United States, Japan, Germany, and Mexico. He was a regular tag partner of Steve Regal in the United Kingdom and has competed in New Japan Pro-Wrestling's annual tournament, the Super J Cup, in 1997, where he picked up a victory over Chris Jericho.

Professional wrestling career 
Brooks was discovered by Bobby Barron, who invited him to wrestle at the Pleasure Beach in Blackpool, and Brian Dixon, who got Brooks some jobs on the holiday camps with established wrestlers such as Steve Adonis. Wrestling as Robbie Brookside (a name given to him by Dixon, in reference to the Channel 4 soap Brookside), he first appeared on television in Britain for All Star Wrestling in 1987–1988.  During this period, he tag-teamed regularly with Steve Regal as The Golden Boys.  Their most notable match was against Kendo Nagasaki and "Blondie" Barrett at a late 1988 TV taping in Bedworth in which Brookside unmasked Nagasaki who retaliated by hypnotizing Brookside to turn on Regal, causing their team to lose the match. This started an angle, running on after the end of TV and into the 1990s in which Nagasaki would hypnotize Brookside into assisting and even tag partnering him. Brookside won his first title after World Heavy-Middleweight Champion "Rollerball" Mark Rocco retired and Brookside won the vacant title in a tournament. The following year, he lost it to Frank "Chic" Cullen.

Brookside then teamed with Doc Dean as The Liverpool Lads, together winning the British Tag Team Championship.  During this period, Brookside produced a Video Diary for BBC2 including footage inside the ring (including the Liverpool Lads' 21 January 1993 tag title loss to Steve Prince and Vic Powers in Norwich) and backstage footage, as well as a visit to the United States to reunite with Regal, by then working for WCW. Frankie Sloan later teamed with Brookside as The Liverpool Lads in place of Dean. In 1996, Brookside got the chance to wrestle in Germany for the Catch Wrestling Association through his contact with the group, Dave "Fit" Finlay. From then through to the turn of the century, Brookside could be found wrestling across many promotions in Europe and won many titles during his travels.

Brookside spent six months in the U.S. wrestling for World Championship Wrestling, including several matches on Nitro, WCW's main TV shown worldwide. On 25 April 2005, he had a dark match on World Wrestling Entertainment's Raw during a taping of the show in the UK, losing to Simon Dean. When WWE once again returned to England, Brookside joined other British wrestlers Thunder and Steve Lewington as part of the WWE security squad that helped keep the warring Raw and SmackDown! wrestlers apart.

Brookside continued to wrestle in and around the UK and remained one of the top British wrestlers, winning many of the top titles in the UK. Brookside became the first-ever Real Quality Wrestling Heavyweight Champion on 29 April 2006, defeating former WWE and WCW Superstar Billy Kidman during a match at RQW's A Night of Champions event. Brookside would later go on to win the Frontier Wrestling Alliance's British Heavyweight Championship at the FWA Summer Classic in a no-DQ elimination three-way match, finally pinning Jonny Storm after then-champion Hade Vansen, who was eliminated first, returned to the ring and hit Storm with his South City Driller finishing move.

Though FWA Champion, Brookside was in fact wrestling under the banner of another promotion, All Star Wrestling. Brookside remained an All-Star wrestler throughout his reign, with various FWA wrestlers trying to take back "their" championship. During this time, Brookside vacated his RQW Heavyweight title and left the promotion. Brookside also took an interest in the future of the business by going on to train future wrestlers, eventually opening his own Leicester-based wrestling school, Wrestleicester, in late 2006.

Brookside appeared on the 23 April 2007 episode of Raw, losing a no disqualification, 3-on-1 handicap match to Shane McMahon, Vince McMahon, and Umaga. Brookside was introduced as a man that Shane McMahon had personally seen take down six men by himself in a fight at a local pub. Brookside has also had WWE matches against Snitsky and Maven. Brookside wrestled around the country in 2008, including defeating James Mason in a World of Sport rules match at Maesteg Town Hall.

In February 2008, Brookside won All-Star Promotions British Heavyweight Championship for the second time but was forced to vacate the title in May 2009 due to injury. At a WWE house show in Birmingham on 7 November 2011, William Regal announced that Brookside was in the crowd and credited him with his success as well as that of Sheamus and Wade Barrett.

In 2013, Brookside, who had already been working as a talent scout for WWE, began working as a coach in WWE's developmental system, NXT, also ending his career in the active competition after nearly 30 years. Brookside made an appearance on the 16 February 2015 episode of Raw, separating a brawl between Daniel Bryan and Roman Reigns.

According to Pro Wrestling Torch in 2017, Brookside teaches the beginner class at the WWE Performance Center, the first of four levels of classes.

Personal life
Brookside's daughter Xia Brookside is also a wrestler, performing on NXT UK.

Championships and accomplishments 
 All Action Wrestling
 AAW North East Heavyweight Championship (1 time)
 All Star Wrestling
 ASW British Heavyweight Championship (2 times)
 ASW British Tag Team Championship (2 times) – with Doc Dean
 ASW World Heavy-Middleweight Championship (1 time)
 Catch Wrestling Association
 CWA British Commonwealth Championship (1 time)
 CWA Intercontinental Heavyweight Championship (1 time)
 CWA World Tag Team Championship (1 time) – with Cannonball Grizzly
 European Wrestling Promotion
EWP Intercontinental Championship (2 times)
 Ironman Hardcore Knockout Tournament (2001)
 European Wrestling Union
 European Heavyweight Championship (2 times)
 European Tag Team Championship (1 time) – with Doc Dean
 Manfred Koch Memorial Cup (2001)
 Frontier Wrestling Alliance
 FWA British Heavyweight Championship (1 time)
 FWA European Union Championship (1 time)
 New Alliance of Wrestling Athletes
 NAWA Heavyweight Championship (1 time)
 Premier Promotions
 PWF Heavyweight Championship (1 time)
 Premier Wrestling Federation
 Worthing Trophy (1995, 1999, 2005)
 Ken Joyce Trophy (2004, 2006, 2009)
 Wrestler of the Year (1995, 2005)
 Professional Wrestling Alliance
 PWA European Championship (2 times)
 Real Quality Wrestling
 RQW Heavyweight Championship (1 time)
 The Wrestling Alliance
 TWA British Heavyweight Champion (2 times)
 TWA British Tag Team Championship (1 time) – with Doug Williams (1)
 TWA Hardcore Championship (1 time)
 Westside Xtreme Wrestling
 wXw World Heavyweight Championship (1 time)
Hall of Fame (Class of 2019)

References 

1966 births
English male professional wrestlers
Living people
Professional wrestling trainers
Sportspeople from Liverpool
Expatriate professional wrestlers
English expatriate sportspeople in the United States
English expatriate sportspeople in Germany
20th-century professional wrestlers
21st-century professional wrestlers